The Rondo in C major for two pianos, Op. posth. 73, by Frédéric Chopin, was composed in 1828, when the composer was just 18 years old and a student at the Warsaw Conservatory. A typical performance lasts 8–9 minutes.

The work was originally conceived for solo piano, although Chopin soon after arranged it for two pianos. The work was not published until after his death, when the two-piano version reached print in Berlin in 1855.

Notable recordings 
For solo piano
Vladimir Ashkenazy
Garrick Ohlsson
Frederic Chiu
For two pianos
Daniil Trifonov and Sergei Babayan

References

External links 

Compositions by Frédéric Chopin
Compositions in C major